Ugia egcarsia is a species of moth in the family Erebidae. It is found in Angola.

References

Endemic fauna of Angola
Moths described in 1911
Ugia
Moths of Africa